Brianne Lea McLaughlin (born June 20, 1987) is an American ice hockey goaltender. During her career, she played for the United States women's national ice hockey team and the Buffalo Beauts of the National Women's Hockey League (NWHL).

Playing career
McLaughlin attended Elyria Catholic High School in Elyria, Ohio. She went on to play ice hockey for four years (2006 to 2009) at Robert Morris Colonials women's ice hockey program. McLaughlin set an NCAA record of 3,809 career saves. Overall, she stopped 3,809 of the 4,188 shots she faced, resulting in a .910 save percentage. She recorded at least 50 saves four times as a senior with the Robert Morris Colonials in 2008–09. In the 2010 CWHL Draft, she was drafted 24th overall by the Burlington Barracudas but never played a game for them.

Team USA
In 2008, McLaughlin played one game in the United States Women's Under-22 series with Canada. She stopped 20 of 26 shots in just under 44 minutes. She made her Olympic debut for the US on February 14, 2010. It was a 12–1 United States victory over China in the preliminary round. In a game versus Finland at the 2012 IIHF Women's World Championship, Brianne McLaughlin made nine saves as she posted a shutout in an 11–0 victory. McLaughlin was named to her second Olympic team for the 2014 Winter Olympics.

Buffalo Beauts
McLaughlin joined the Buffalo Beauts for the NWHL's inaugural 2015/16 season as the franchise's starting goaltender, and was selected to play in the league's All Star Game that season.
In July 2016, McLaughlin re-signed with Buffalo Beauts for the 2016/17 season, signing a one-year $17,000 contract.

Awards and honors
All-CHA First Team (2008–09)
CHA All-Academic Team (2008–09)
Silver medal – 2010 Winter Olympics in Hockey

Silver medal – 2014 Winter Olympics in Hockey

New venture
McLaughlin currently owns and operates a goalie training facility in Neville Island, Pennsylvania, 15 minutes northwest of Pittsburgh.

References

External links
 
 
 
 
 
 McLaughlin Gold Medal Goalie Training and All Girls Camp
 

1987 births
Living people
American women's ice hockey goaltenders
Buffalo Beauts players
Ice hockey players from Ohio
Ice hockey players at the 2010 Winter Olympics
Ice hockey players at the 2014 Winter Olympics
Isobel Cup champions
Medalists at the 2010 Winter Olympics
Medalists at the 2014 Winter Olympics
Premier Hockey Federation players
Olympic silver medalists for the United States in ice hockey
People from Elyria, Ohio
Robert Morris Colonials women's ice hockey players